Paolo Benetazzo (born 16 July 1976) is an Italian film director, actor, screenwriter, producer, editor and visual artist.
He made his feature film directorial debut with Study (2012),  which has been screened and awarded at international film festivals worldwide. Distinguished by a profound cinematic individualism, the film was entirely shot by Benetazzo without any film crew. He is the founder of independent film production company ARTtouchesART.

Early life and education 
Benetazzo was born in Vicenza, Veneto, Italy. At the age of 19 he began acting and filming while attending the University of Padua. Experiencing a temporary conflict with the academic environment, he interrupted his studies for some years, picking up different jobs, until he eventually graduated in 2003 with a master's degree in psychology.

Career 
In 2007 after travelling around Europe and living in Dublin for a few years, Benetazzo started working on his feature film directorial debut. Discouraged by the Italian film industry, he moved to London and founded ARTtouchesART Films in 2012.

Between 2007 and 2012 he wrote, produced, photographed and directed the independent film Study. He also starred in the lead role and composed the soundtrack. Since its premiere in London in 2012, the film has quickly developed a cult following among fans and audience.

At the end of 2012 Benetazzo worked with artist Danny Sherwood in the production of "Bitter Ditty". In 2013 he directed and edited the music video "Salamander" for rock band Mount Fabric and "Like to Party" for electronic producer Cal Strange. During the same year he also directed the short film Sense, which was selected in a number of film festivals including the Seattle Erotic Art Festival. In 2015 Benetazzo directed the music video "Love me Hurt me" for French artist Oriana Curls.

Filmography

Feature films

Short films

Music videos

Discography

Albums

References

External links 
 Official Website
 

1976 births
Living people
People from Vicenza
Italian film directors
Italian film producers
Italian screenwriters
21st-century Italian male actors
Italian male film actors
Italian editors
University of Padua alumni
Italian male screenwriters